Kent Stetson,  (born July 5, 1948) is a Canadian playwright and novelist.

Stetson is best known for the plays Warm Wind in China (1988), one of the first and most prominent AIDS-themed plays produced in Canada; As I Am (1986), a noted gay-themed work; and the Governor General's Award-winning The Harps of God (1997). His other plays include Queen of the Cadillac (1990), Just Plain Murder (1992), Sweet Magdalena (1994), The Eyes of the Gull (2000), New Arcadia (2001) and Horse High, Bull Strong, Pig Tight (2004). He has also published two novels, The World Above the Sky (2010) and Meat Cove (2013).

The Harps of God received the 2001 Governor General's Literary Award for English language drama, and the 2001 Canadian Authors Association's inaugural Carol Bolt Award. He won the Herman Voaden Playwriting Competition for New Arcadia, the Prince Edward Island Literary Award for outstanding contributions to the literature of Prince Edward Island, and the Wendell Boyle Award for contributions to PEI heritage.

Stetson was appointed to the Order of Canada in July 2007.

References

External links 
Official website

1948 births
Living people
Canadian male novelists
Writers from Prince Edward Island
Members of the Order of Canada
Governor General's Award-winning dramatists
20th-century Canadian dramatists and playwrights
21st-century Canadian dramatists and playwrights
21st-century Canadian novelists
Canadian LGBT dramatists and playwrights
Canadian LGBT novelists
Canadian gay writers
Canadian male dramatists and playwrights
20th-century Canadian male writers
21st-century Canadian male writers
Gay dramatists and playwrights
Gay novelists
21st-century Canadian LGBT people
20th-century Canadian LGBT people